"Ultraviolet" / "The Ballad of Paul K" is the fourth and final single from British pop rock band McFly's second studio album, Wonderland (2005). It is a double A-side single and was released on 12 December 2005. The single peaked at  9 on the UK Singles Chart (their first not to reach the top five in that country) and No. 25 on the Irish Singles Chart

Song information
Both tracks were written by McFly members Tom Fletcher and Danny Jones, with "The Ballad of Paul K" being written also by Dougie Poynter, who was the principal writer. The Ballad of Paul K was based on the members of McFly's fathers. The song is about a middle-aged man coming to terms with his life. The song "Ultraviolet" was initially called "Summer Girls".

Music videos
The "Ultraviolet" video was simply a montage of clips filmed at Live at McFly's Wonderland Tour 2005, Manchester and Behind the Scenes of their first Arena tour. The Ballad of Paul K video was a little different. The video uses a blend of live action and animation. It is often considered to be in the style of Tim Burton movies, especially The Nightmare Before Christmas and Corpse Bride. In a TV interview, McFly admitted that watching the video now does scare them slightly.

Track listings

Charts

References

McFly songs
2005 singles
Island Records singles
Song recordings produced by Hugh Padgham
Song recordings produced by Steve Power
Songs written by Danny Jones
Songs written by Dougie Poynter
Songs written by Tom Fletcher
Universal Records singles